Channel 4 is a British television station, operated by the Channel Four Television Corporation.

Channel 4 may also refer to:

Television networks, channels and stations
TV4 (Algerian TV channel), fourth Algerian public television channel, operated by EPTV Group
Channel 4 (Australian TV channel), a digital free-to-air electronic program guide
Canal 4 (Salvadoran TV channel), operated by Telecorporación Salvadoreña
IRIB TV4, operated by Islamic Republic of Iran Broadcasting
Canal 4 (Nicaraguan TV channel), a national television channel in Nicaragua
Canal 4 (Uruguayan TV channel), formerly known as Monte Carlo TV, a Uruguayan television channel
Canal 4 Navarra, a former television channel in Spain
4SD, a San Diego sports broadcasting network
4RD, a public TV channel in the Dominican Republic owned by Corporación Estatal de Radio y Televisión
Cuatro (TV channel), a Spanish television network launched in November 2005
DWGT-TV Channel 4, the flagship television station of the People's Television Network in the Philippines
La Red (Chilean TV channel) a Chilean television channel broadcasting on Channel 4 in Santiago de Chile
MBC 4, in the Middle East
Channel 9 MCOT HD, name that replaced channel 4 of Thailand
Nelonen (television) (4), a Finnish broadcaster
RTS (Ecuadorian TV channel), a private Ecuadorian TV network
Rete 4, Italian for Network 4, the fourth television channel in Italian analogue terrestrial television
S4C (Sianel Pedwar Cymru, 'Channel Four Wales'), a Welsh-language television station
E4 (TV channel), British television channel of Channel 4
TG4, Teilifís na Gaeilge, an Irish-language broadcaster
BBC Four, British television channel of the BBC
 Canal Cuatro, former name of Peruvian television station América Televisión
 Cuatro Televisión, former name of Paraguayan televisión station Telefuturo
Venevisión, a Venezuelan television channel broadcasting on Channel 4 in Caracas, Venezuela
WAPA-TV Channel 4, a independent television station in San Juan, Puerto Rico
WNBC-TV Channel 4, an NBC-affiliated television station in New York City, United States
XHTV-TDT Channel 4, a television station in Mexico City, flagship of Foro TV network

Other uses
Channel 4 FM, a radio station in the United Arab Emirates
Channel 3/4 output, a channel option provided to video cassette recorders, early DVD players and video game consoles
Quadraphonic sound or 4-channel audio, a form of surround sound
4chan, an English-language imageboard website
Channel 4 (Fear the Walking Dead), an episode of the television series Fear the Walking Dead

See also
 TV4 (disambiguation)
 C4 (disambiguation)
 Channel 4 branded TV stations in the United States
 Channel 4 virtual TV stations in Canada
 Channel 4 virtual TV stations in Mexico
 Channel 4 virtual TV stations in the United States
For VHF frequencies covering 66-72 MHz:
 Channel 4 TV stations in Canada
 Channel 4 TV stations in Mexico
 Channel 4 digital TV stations in the United States
 Channel 4 low-power TV stations in the United States

04